Palo Verde is a canton in Apaneca Municipality, Ahuachapán Department in El Salvador.

Climate
Palo Verde has a Subtropical highland climate (Cwb) with very wet summers and much drier winters.

References

Sonsonate Department